Sir Roland Francis Kester Keating (born 5 August 1961) is Chief Executive of the British Library. He took up his post in September 2012.

Early life and education
Keating was born on 5 August 1961 to Donald Norman Keating and Betty Katharine Keating (née Wells). He was educated at Westminster School, an independent school for boys in London, and then read Classics at Balliol College, Oxford.

Career
Keating joined the BBC in 1983. He was a producer and director for the Arts and Music department, making programmes for Omnibus, Bookmark (1992–97) and Arena. He was a producer and later became editor of The Late Show. In 1997, he became head of programming for UKTV, partly owned by the BBC. In 1999, he became the BBC Controller of Digital Channels. In 2000, he also took on the responsibility of Controller of Arts Commissioning. He became the Controller of digital television station BBC Four in December 2001, masterminding its launch on 2 March 2002. In 2003, he was also joint leader of the BBC's Charter Review project for six months. He became the channel controller for BBC Two in June 2004, a position he held until 2008. He was appointed temporary controller of BBC One following Peter Fincham's resignation on 5 October 2007.

While Controller, he said that he wanted to see BBC Two be the first mainstream British TV channel to be available on broadband. His decision to screen Jerry Springer: The Opera on 8 January 2005 forced him to go into hiding and he was given security protection.

Keating was previously Director of Archive Content for the BBC. He was announced as chief executive designate of the British Library in May 2012, to succeed Dame Lynne Brindley.

As of 2015, Keating was paid a salary of between £155,000 and £159,999 by the British Library, making him one of the 328 most highly paid people in the British public sector at that time.

Keating was knighted in the 2023 New Year Honours for services to literature.

Personal life
In 1989, Keating married Caroline Russell. Together they have three children; one son and two daughters.

References

External links
 BBC Biography for Roly Keating
 Changing BBC TWO's idents in February 2007

1961 births
Living people
Alumni of Balliol College, Oxford
BBC executives
BBC Four controllers
BBC Two controllers
Knights Bachelor
People educated at Westminster School, London